T. insignis  may refer to:
 Tetraceratops insignis, a lizard-like synapsid species that lived during the Early Permian period
 Thamnochortus insignis, a grass-like restio species found in Africa
 Thamnophilus insignis, the streak-backed antshrike, a bird species found in Brazil, Guyana and Venezuela
 Thaumastoptera insignis, a crane fly species in the genus Thaumastoptera
 Thyreus insignis, a bee species in the genus Thyreus
 Tityus insignis, a scorpion species in the genus Tityus
 Tonicella insignis, a chiton species in the genus Tonicella
 Torellia insignis, a sea snail species
 Trachelyopterus insignis, a species of catfish
 Trochisciopsis insignis, an alga species in the genus Trochisciopsis

Synonyms
 Tadarida insignis, a synonym for Tadarida teniotis, the European free-tailed bat, a bat species found across the Old World